Route 1 is a highway in the southern part of the Canadian province of New Brunswick.

The entire highway is a 4-lane controlled-access freeway (from the Maine border to River Glade). It is one of the most important highways in the province, carrying traffic from the American border at St. Stephen, through the City of Saint John, to the highway's end at an interchange with the Trans Canada Highway at Riverglade.

History
The majority of road development in New Brunswick follows settlement patterns which pre-dated motor transport, thus most communities developed along navigable waterways or were served by railways. The development of controlled access expressways only began in the 1960s and only around the largest communities. The majority of early provincial highway improvements merely consisted of upgrading local roads.

Early route
Route 1 initially followed local roads from St. Stephen eastward to Oak Bay where it swung south to the town of St. Andrews, then back north and east (still along local roads) until reaching Saint John where it followed Manawagonish Road through the former city of Lancaster and was later diverted to follow the "Golden Mile" immediately south of Manawagonish Road. It crossed the Saint John River at the Reversing Falls Bridge before proceeding on Douglas Avenue into the north end of the city. From there it went over to Rothesay Avenue and followed the shores of the Kennebecasis River up the valley to Sussex where it ended. Over time, various sections of 2-lane controlled access highway were built to bypass the growing towns and villages, including a long section bypassing the townships of Rothesay and Quispamsis, named the Mackay Highway, having been built through a stretch of timberland formerly owned by the locally prominent Mackay family.

Saint John Throughway

The earliest significant upgrade to this routing came in the late 1960s during an urban-renewal project in Saint John which saw the construction of a new highway (the Saint John Throughway) to bypass increased truck traffic around the city. Several alignment options were examined with the majority of citizens wanting the highway to go north of the city through the suburb of Millidgeville from where an easier crossing of the Reversing Falls gorge could be attempted.

However, the city, along with the provincial and federal governments, decided to bargain with the Canadian Pacific Railway (CPR) to purchase the majority of the Mill Street Yard near the neo-gothic Union Station for a highway alignment which would run through the middle of the city (somewhat like the infamous Interstate 93 alignment which was built through Boston).

The removal of the rail yard and historic station coincided with the federally-controlled National Harbours Board building the 4-lane Saint John Harbour Bridge downstream of the Reversing Falls which opened in 1968. Part of this deal involved the NHB collecting a 25¢ toll in each direction, however the toll cannot be raised without federal, provincial and municipal agreement, until 2007 when the toll was increased to 50¢. The new bridge also had the added effect of cutting the upper part of Saint John Harbour off from large ship traffic.

In a related project, in 1969, the federal and provincial governments worked with CPR to revamp the Saint John-Digby ferry service by building a new terminal in the city's west end, along with interchanges off the new expressway.

Mackay Highway
The Saint John Throughway only extended from Spruce Lake at Lorneville in the west, to where it met the end of the Mackay Highway and Rothesay Avenue in the east at Coldbrook but its construction coincided with the decline of rail traffic and rise of truck traffic and personal automobile travel. The Saint John area soon saw the growth of suburbs in the towns of Rothesay and Quispamsis in the Kennebecasis River valley, which were located just outside the Bay of Fundy's "fog belt."

In the 1970s, the Mackay Highway was upgraded from a 2-lane highway to a 4-lane divided highway, and the controlled-access section of the highway was extended further to accommodate the growing town of Quispamsis.

Extending controlled access
In a new focus on improving arterial highways in the province, the provincial government during the 1960s-1980s undertook other improvements to Route 1, namely in building new sections (or designating existing sections) as controlled access. This resulted in the establishment of maximum speed limits of 100 km/h (62 mph) on these sections.

In the mid-1990s, a 2-lane bypass of Hampton was built up the Kennebecasis Valley from where the Mackay Highway ended, rejoining local roads at Norton. Another bypass was built from Oak Bay to Digdeguash to avoid the circuitous routing down the St. Andrews peninsula and through the town of the same name. Further 2-lane bypasses were built around St. George and on the outskirts of Sussex where an interchange with the Trans-Canada Highway was built.

4-lane construction
The provincial government changed in 1987 with the election of Premier Frank McKenna who was focused on improving the province's business climate. One of the government's major tasks was to revamp provincial transportation infrastructure and McKenna entered into aggressive negotiations with the federal government of prime minister Brian Mulroney to secure federal funding of new highway projects. McKenna viewed the Trans-Canada and Route 1 in New Brunswick as being partially a federal responsibility since they funnelled the majority of Atlantic Canada's highway traffic to the U.S. and central Canada. The signing of the Canada-U.S. Free Trade Agreement in 1989, coupled with federal approval for numerous railway line abandonments in the Maritimes during the 1980s, led to predictions of further highway traffic growth on New Brunswick highways in the 1990s.

Under the remainder of the McKenna administration's years of power (until 1997), Route 1 saw 4-lane expansion and upgrading between Lorneville to Lepreau in the west and between Coldbrook and Apohaqui (near Sussex) in the east. A small 4-lane re-alignment was also built between St. George and Pennfield. The Trans-Canada Highway (Route 2) was also upgraded to 4-lanes between Penobsquis and Petitcodiac.

Upgrades to Route 1 continued in the late 2000s, with a 4-lane section between St. Stephen and the Route 127 junction at Waweig opening to traffic in December 2008. The St. Stephen Bypass, which had been partially open since 1993 as a 2-lane controlled access route to siphon traffic to the Milltown border crossing, was also upgraded and officially became part of Route 1 at this time. The bypass was completed in November 2009 with the opening of the International Avenue Bridge to Calais, Maine.

It was announced on September 5, 2008 that the remaining stretch of Route 1 that connects to the United States will be twinned.  The estimated cost would be $1.2 Billion (including maintenance and not accounting for inflation) with PPP Canada contributing half the cost of construction for an amount estimated to be about $290 million.  Work was completed in October 2012. The project was completed in much the same manner as the upgrade and realignment of the Trans-Canada Highway. A private consortium was chosen through a tendering process, and was responsible for the design, and construction for the sections not yet upgraded to 4-lane status. After construction was completed the company formed by the consortium will be responsible for the maintenance of the highway from the US-Canada border crossing, to the interchange with Route 2 at River Glade, 15 km west of Moncton until the year 2040.

On October 25, 2012, the final 8 kilometers of 4-lane highway were opened, completing the project.

Trans-Canada re-alignment
The final years of the McKenna administration saw an agreement signed with a private consortium called Maritime Road Development Corporation (led by former provincial Liberal leader and former federal Minister of Transport Douglas Young) to privately finance and build a toll highway to carry the Trans-Canada Highway (Route 2) in a new alignment from a point west of Fredericton to a point on the existing TCH west of Moncton at River Glade.

The toll issue was not without controversy as it led to the downfall of McKenna's successor, Camille Theriault in 1999 to PC leader Bernard Lord. The highway was built, but tolls were removed from most portions of the highway before they opened and this portion of the privately built (and owned) re-alignment of the Trans-Canada Highway has a hidden toll which is charged to the provincial government, thus motorists do not directly pay for their highway usage.

Plans called for completion of a 4-lane bypass to replace the old TCH alignment around Sussex and construction took place from 2000–2004. A portion of the old TCH alignment from Sussex toward Fredericton has been re-designated as Route 10 and a re-aligned interchange has been built at Sussex.

Saint John exit upgrades

An experiment with Sunbury's new A-Trains led to the redesign of highway exit 119. Exit 119-B, west-bound, was widened to allow these longer transport truck configurations to navigate the exit. On the opposite side of the highway, the two east-bound on-ramps were combined into a wider single ramp, again to allow easier navigation for the longer transport trucks to navigate.

An east-bound exit was never officially available at exit 128, as it was only a private truck entrance into Strescon's property. In the fall of 2007, this exit was rebuilt into an official exit to allow east-bound traffic access to Rothesay Ave. East-bound traffic can now exit/enter to/from Rothesay Ave (via Ashburn Road) and west-bound traffic can exit/enter to/from Foster Thurston Drive. There is no overpass at this exit.

In December, 2013 the "One Mile House" interchange officially opened after over 4 years of construction with a final price tag of $83 million. This new interchange includes a new 500 m bridge to cross the highway, rail yard, river, and Rothesay Avenue and connects directly to Bayside Drive and Loch Lomond Road, with access to/from Route 100 on Rothesay Avenue. This allows traffic destined for the McAllister and Grandview Industrial Parks and the heavy industrial businesses in that area to get more direct access to Highway 1 and avoid the uptown Saint John streets. The name, "One Mile House", is derived from the section of Saint John located along the railway 1 mile east of the former Union Station.

Exit list

See also
List of New Brunswick provincial highways
 East–West Highway (New England)

External links
 Steve Anderson's BostonRoads.com: Unbuilt Interstate 92 in New England, providing a link between NB's Route 1 and the United States]

References

001
001
001
001
001
Hampton, New Brunswick
St. Stephen, New Brunswick
Transport in Saint John, New Brunswick